WWE (formerly the WWF, WWWF, and its predecessor, Capitol Wrestling) has maintained several women's professional wrestling championships since acquiring The Fabulous Moolah's NWA World Women's Championship in 1984. Whenever brand division has been implemented, separate women's titles have been created or allocated for each brand.

Overview of titles

Singles

Tag Team

Others
In addition to titles specifically designated for women, women in WWE have also won four other championships. Two of these titles have been explicitly open to all challengers, while two others were traditionally considered "men's titles".

History

Singles Women's Championships 
On September 18, 1956, The Fabulous Moolah became the third NWA World Women's Champion. Moolah had worked for the northeastern United States-based Capitol Wrestling Corporation, a member of the National Wrestling Alliance (NWA), since the previous year. In 1963, Capitol Wrestling seceded from the NWA and established itself as the World Wide Wrestling Federation (WWWF); it quietly rejoined the NWA in 1971. Moolah bought the rights to the championship in the 1970s, and continued to defend the championship as the NWA World Women's Champion. The WWWF, renamed the World Wrestling Federation (WWF) in 1979, withdrew from the NWA for good in 1983. Moolah sold the championship's rights to the WWF in 1984, and she was recognized as the WWF Women's Champion. Instead of beginning her reign in 1984, the WWF claimed the lineage of her reign from when she first became champion in 1956. The preceding champions and the title changes between 1956 and when Moolah lost it in 1984 are not recognized by WWE, although they are recognized by the NWA. As a result, The Fabulous Moolah's first reign is considered to have lasted 28 years by the promotion.

In 1990, the Women's Championship became inactive after Rockin' Robin vacated the championship following her departure from the WWF. Then in December 1993, the title was reactivated with Alundra Blayze winning a tournament for the vacant Women's Championship. However, the Women's Championship became inactive again when Blayze was released from the WWF. Blayze, as Madusa, unexpectedly signed with World Championship Wrestling (WCW) in 1995 and threw the championship belt, which was still in her possession, in a trash can on an episode of WCW Monday Nitro. The Women's Championship was reactivated again in September 1998 when Jacqueline Moore defeated Sable to win the title.

After the WWF/WWE name change in 2002, the championship was subsequently referred to as the WWE Women's Championship. With the WWE brand extension in March 2002, the Women's Championship at first was still defended on both the Raw and SmackDown brands, while most titles were exclusive to one brand. In September, the Women's Championship became exclusive to only the Raw brand, but remained the sole championship contested by women until July 4, 2008, when a counterpart to the championship, called the WWE Divas Championship, was created for the SmackDown brand. The titles switched brands after their respective title holders were drafted to the opposite brands in the 2009 WWE draft.

The Women's Championship was unified with the Divas Championship at Night of Champions in September 2010, creating the Unified WWE Divas Championship and rendering the Women's Championship defunct as the unified title followed the lineage of the Divas Championship; shortly after, the title dropped the "Unified" moniker. The Divas Championship continued as the only women's championship of the main roster until 2016 when it was retired and replaced by a new WWE Women's Championship at WrestleMania 32. This came after the term "Diva" was scrutinized by some commentators, fans, and several past and present WWE female performers who were in favor of changing the championship to the Women's Championship. The division itself was also changed from being called the Divas division to being called the Women's division. The new championship does not share its title history with the previous championships.

Following the reintroduction of the brand extension in July 2016, then-champion Charlotte Flair was drafted to the Raw brand, making the championship exclusive to Raw. In response, SmackDown created the SmackDown Women's Championship on August 23, 2016. The WWE Women's Championship was subsequently renamed Raw Women's Championship to reflect its exclusivity to that brand. In addition, WWE's former developmental territory NXT established the NXT Women's Championship in April 2013, which became one of WWE's three main women's titles in September 2019 when NXT became WWE's third major brand but reverted back to a developmental brand in 2021. Another title, the NXT UK Women's Championship, debuted for NXT's sister brand NXT UK in 2018, but was recognized as being a step below the others. It was unified into the NXT Women's Championship in September 2022. Nikki A.S.H. is the only woman to have competed for all currently active women's championships, as well as the now retired NXT UK Women's Championship and gender neutral 24/7 Championship.

Tag Team Women's Championships 
In 1983, the reigning NWA Women's World Tag Team Champions of Velvet McIntyre and Princess Victoria joined the WWF. As the WWF had withdrawn from the NWA, which owned the championship, McIntyre and Victoria were recognized as the first WWF Women's Tag Team Champions. The championship continued until 1989 the year when the championship deactivated.

The WWE would go without a women's tag team championship for many years afterwards. WWE even talked about reviving the 1983 women's tag team titles, the conversation began circulating all throughout the year 2012 after the Original WWE Women's title had been deactivated after being unified with the WWE Divas Championship in 2010, when a WWE.com article was posted in favor of resurrecting the titles. Female performers were also in favor of adding a women's tag team championship. Online speculation began when WWE announced their first all female event, Evolution, for October, but the titles did not appear. On the December 24 episode of Monday Night Raw, WWE Chairman Vince McMahon officially announced that a new WWE Women's Tag Team Championship would debut in 2019 (and would not carry the lineage of the original title). The Boss 'n' Hug Connection (Bayley and Sasha Banks) became the inaugural champions at Elimination Chamber in February. It was also revealed that the titles would be defended across Raw, SmackDown, and NXT.

Afterwards the WWE Women's Tag Team Championship continued to also be defended on the NXT roster as well as the main rosters until March 2021. On the March 10th, 2021 episode of NXT, when NXT General Manager William Regal established the NXT Women's Tag Team Championship, naming Dakota Kai and Raquel González as the first champions, after their controversial ending of their match for the WWE Women's Tag Team Championship a week prior to them winning the first ever Women's Dusty Rhodes Tag Team Classic. Afterwards the WWE Women's Tag Team Championship no longer became available to the NXT roster but the main rosters such as SmackDown and Raw only.

Champions

Current champions 
The following list shows the women wrestlers that are currently holding all active women's and gender-neutral championships in WWE.

Retired championships 
The following list shows retired women championships and the final female title holders before the belts were deactivated in WWE.

Superlative reigns

Ten longest

Singles championships
The following list shows the top 10 longest women's championship reigns in WWE history.

A + indicates it is the current reign.

Tag team championships
The following list shows the top 10 longest women's tag team championship reigns in WWE history.

Longest per championship
The following list shows the longest reigning champion for each singles and tag team women's championship.

Most per championship 
The following list shows the wrestlers with the most reigns for each women's championship created and/or promoted by WWE.

Most total reigns 
The following list shows the wrestlers who have the most reigns in total for women's singles championships, combining all titles they have held as recognized by WWE. This list also shows the titles that they won to achieve this record (minimum of four reigns).

Most combined days as champions
The following list shows the top 10 female wrestlers based on their most combined days as champions in WWE history.

See also 

 World championships in WWE
 Tag team championships in WWE
 Women in WWE

References

 
Women's professional wrestling championships